USNS Sgt. William R. Button (T-AK-3012), (former MV Sgt. William R. Button (AK-3012)), is the fifth ship of the  built in 1986. The ship is named after Sergeant William Robert Button, an American Marine who was awarded the Medal of Honor during United States occupation of Haiti.

Construction and commissioning 
The ship was laid down in November 1984 and launched in May 1986 at the Fore River Shipyard, Quincy, Massachusetts. Later acquired in June 1986 by the Maritime Administration for operation by American Overseas Marine.

The ship unloaded equipments and supplies in Saudi Arabia during the Operation Desert Shield on 13 December 1990. On 15 October 1998, William R. Button unloaded equipments and supplies in Pohang for Exercise Foal Eagle '98.

On 17 January 2006, the ship was purchased by the Military Sealift Command and was put into the Prepositioning Program and the Maritime Prepositioning Ship Squadron 2. The ship operates in the Indian Ocean, out of Diego Garcia. Later that year during Southeast Asia Cooperation Against Terrorism (SEACAT) on the 28 May, sailors from USS Crommelin (FFG-37) and USS Hopper (DDG-70) conducted an inspection on board the ship.  Sailors from the KD Kasturi (F-25) also conducted simulated boarding on board the ship.

The ship took part in Exercise Pacific Horizon 2011, off the coast of Camp Pendelton, California.  William R. Button was moored off the coast of Latvia for the Saber Strike 17 Maritime Prepositioning Force offload operations on 25 May 2017. On 21 December 2021, mariners on board the ship and few others voluntarily donated toys and trinkets for residents of Guma’ Esperansa, Saipan.

Gallery

References

2nd Lt John P. Bobo-class dry cargo ship
1986 ships
Ships built in Quincy, Massachusetts
Gulf War ships of the United States
Merchant ships of the United States
Cargo ships of the United States Navy
Container ships of the United States Navy